SOX1 is a gene that encodes a transcription factor with a HMG-box (high mobility group) DNA-binding domain and functions primarily in neurogenesis. SOX1, SOX2 and SOX3, members of the SOX gene family (specifically the SOXB1 group), contain transcription factors related to SRY, the testis-determining factor.

SOX1 exerts its importance in its role in development of the central nervous system (neurogenesis) and in particular the development of the eye, where it is functionally redundant with SOX3 and to a lesser degree SOX2, and maintenance of neural progenitor cell identity. SOX1 expression is restricted to the neuroectoderm by proliferating progenitor cells in the tetrapod embryo. The induction of this neuroectoderm occurs upon expression of the SOX1 gene. In ectodermal cells committed to a certain cell fate, SOX1 has shown to be one of the earliest transcription factors expressed. In particular, SOX1 is first detected in the late head fold stage.

Clinical significance and research

Striatum development

SOX1 is expressed particularly in the ventral striatum, and Sox1-deficient mice have altered striatum development, leading e.g. to epilepsy.

Lens development
SOX1 has shown clinical significance in its direct regulation of gamma-crystallin genes, which is vital for lens development in mice.  Gamma-crystallins serve as a key structural component in lens fiber cells in both mammals and amphibians. Research has shown direct deletion of the SOX1 gene in mice causes cataracts and microphthalmia. These mutant lenses fail to elongate due to the absence of gamma-crystallins.

SOXB1 group redundant roles
SOX1 is a member of the SOX gene family, in particular the SOXB1 group, which includes SOX1, SOX2, and SOX3. The SOX gene family encodes transcription factors. It is suggested the three members of the SOXB1 group have redundant roles in the development of neural stem cells. This group of SOX genes regulate neural progenitor identity. Each of these proteins have unique neural markers. Overexpression of either SOX1, SOX2, or SOX 3  increases neural progenitors and prevents neural differentiation. In non-mammalian vertebrates, loss of one SOXB1 protein results in minor phenotypic differences. This supports the claim that SOXB1 group proteins have redundant roles.

See also
Neurogenesis

References

Transcription factors
Developmental genes and proteins